Ouyang Fei Fei (Romaji: Ōyan Fīfī; born September 10, 1949) is a Taiwanese-Japanese singer.

Biography

In 1967, Ouyang Fei Fei made her musical debut at the Central Hotel, a theatre in Taipei, before coming to Japan to start a recording career. Her debut single "Ame no Midōsuji" (Rainy Midōsuji), released in September 1971, sold over a million units and reached the No. 1 position on the Oricon charts. The song was composed by The Ventures with lyrics written by Haruo Hayashi. The same year, she won the Best Newcomer prize at the 13th Japan Record Awards.

Her second Japanese single release, "Ame no Airport" (Rainy airport), reached the No. 4 position on the Oricon charts and sold nearly 400,000 copies. The song won her the Grand Prize at the 5th Japan Cable Awards.

In 1982, Ouyang released "Love Is Over" as a single in Japan. It had first been released as the B-side to her single "Uwasa no Disco Queen" (Disco Queen rumors), which only sold about 3,000 units. "Love Is Over" reached the No. 1 position on the Oricon charts, selling over half a million units. At the 25th edition of the Japan Record Awards, "Love Is Over" won her the Long Seller prize.

Ouyang appeared three times on Kōhaku Uta Gassen. The first time was in 1972, performing "Koi no Tsuiseki" (Love chase). The second time in 1973, performing "Koi no Jūjiro" (The crossroads of love), and one final time in 1991, performing "Love Is Over".

In April 1978 Ouyang married Sokichi Shikiba, a former Japanese racing driver. They were married until his death in 2016.

Discography

Charted singles in Japan

Japanese studio albums

Kōhaku Uta Gassen Appearances

References

1949 births
Living people
Japanese-language singers
Musicians from Taipei
Taiwanese expatriates in Japan
20th-century Taiwanese women singers
20th-century Japanese women singers
20th-century Japanese singers
21st-century Japanese women singers
21st-century Japanese singers